Lateolabrax is a genus of commercially important fishes known as the Asian seabasses.  It is the only genus in the family Lateolabracidae.  This genus is native to the coastal waters of the western Pacific Ocean.  This genus has also been included in family Moronidae (temperate basses) and may be nested within the Polyprionidae.

Species
The currently recognized species in this genus are:

References

 
Marine fish genera
Taxa named by Pieter Bleeker